Federico Philippi or Friedrich Heinrich Eunom Philippi (16 December 1838 – 16 January 1910) was a German zoologist and botanist active in Chile. He was the youngest son of the famed naturalist Rodolfo Amando Philippi and Caroline Krumwiede. He was born in Naples. The son of Federico Philippi, Julio Philippi Bihl, became a lawyer, economist and politician. The granddaughter of Federico and daughter of Julio, Adriana married Jaime Eyzaguirre in 1934.

References

German emigrants to Chile
Scientists from Naples
1838 births
1910 deaths
Employees of the Chilean National Museum of Natural History
Federico